HC Kuban Krasnodar is a Russian women's handball team from Krasnodar competing in the Russian Super League.

Kuban enjoyed its golden era in the late 1980s, winning two Cup Winners' Cups in 1987 and 1988 by beating TSC Berlin and Vasas Budapest in the final, and reaching the 1990 European Cup's final, lost to Hypo Niederösterreich, after winning the 1989 Soviet Championship. Kuban also played a third unsuccessful Cup Winners' Cup final in 1989.

Following the collapse of the Soviet Union Kuban won the transitional CIS Championship, but it hasn't been able to win the new Russian Super League to date. Between 1997 and 2000 the team was second to Istochnik Rostov and Aqva Volgograd, its best results. In 2000 it also reached its fourth Cup Winners' Cup's final, losing to Mar Valencia.

In reaction to the 2022 Russian invasion of Ukraine, the International Handball Federation banned Russian athletes, and the European Handball Federation suspended the  Russian clubs from competing in European handball competitions.

Kits

Titles
 Cup Winners' Cup
 1987, 1988
 Soviet Championship
 1989, 1992

European record

Team

Current squad
Squad for the 2021–22 season.

Goalkeepers
 16  Veronika Chipula
 78  Mariya Molyavskaya
Wingers
LW
 4  Alexandra Davidenko
 8  Iana Savinova
 94  Sofia Panasovskaya
RW
 5  Valeriia Vaykum
 7  Diana Golub
 24  Anna Efimkova
 33  Milana Rzaeva
Line players
 32  Kristina Suchalkina
 10  Kseniia Trukhina
 87  Mariya Gafonova

Back players
LB
 6  Dalila Danilchenko
 20  Victoria Zhilinskayte
 26  Alina Sergienko
 38  Sofia Sinitskaya
 40  Anastasiya Shavman
 66  Ekaterina Drozdova
CB
 18  Sofiia Penzeva
 50  Sofia Porshina
 71  Ekaterina Levchina
RB
 62  Arina Sergienko
 63  Ekaterina Bobina
 77  Viktoriia Shershkova
 93  Anna Bogdasheva

References

Kuban
Kuban